The year 2002 is the second year in the history of Deep, a mixed martial arts promotion based in Japan. In 2002 Deep held 6 events beginning with, Deep: 4th Impact.

Title fights

Events list

Deep: 4th Impact

Deep: 4th Impact was an event held on March 30, 2002 at the Aichi Prefectural Gymnasium in Nagoya, Japan.

Results

Deep: 5th Impact

Deep: 5th Impact was an event held on June 9, 2002 at the Differ Ariake in Tokyo, Japan.

Results

Deep: clubDeep Ozon

Deep: clubDeep Ozon was an event held on July 14, 2002 at the Club Ozon in Nagoya, Japan.

Results

Deep: 6th Impact

Deep: 6th Impact was an event held on September 7, 2002 at the Ariake Coliseum in Tokyo, Japan.

Results

Deep: clubDeep Ozon

Deep: clubDeep Ozon was an event held on November 10, 2002 at the Club Ozon in Nagoya, Japan.

Results

Deep: 7th Impact

Deep: 7th Impact was an event held on December 8, 2002 at the Differ Ariake in Tokyo, Japan.

Results

See also 
 Deep
 List of Deep champions
 List of Deep events

References

Deep (mixed martial arts) events
2002 in mixed martial arts